Zonnetje is a 1919 Dutch silent film directed by Maurits Binger.

Cast
 Annie Bos - Gloria Grey
 Adelqui Migliar - Tom Chelmsford / Robert Chelmsford
 Renee Spiljar - Dolly
 Lola Cornero - Cora Chelmsford
 Harry Waghalter - John Chelmsford
 Norman Doxat-Pratt
 Kees Pruis - Halliway
 Reginald Lawson
 Carl Tobi
 Marie Spiljar
 Leni Marcus

External links 
 

Dutch silent feature films
1919 films
Dutch black-and-white films
Films directed by Maurits Binger